The following events occurred in January 1924:

January 1, 1924 (Tuesday)
The Rose Bowl football game between the Navy Midshipmen and the Washington Huskies ended in a 14–14 tie.
During a New Year's Day party at the home of millionaire oil broker Courtland S. Dines, the chauffeur of actress Mabel Normand shot and wounded Dines in the abdomen with a pistol belonging to Normand. When police arrived they found Normand and fellow actress Edna Purviance in the kitchen frantically insisting they didn't know how Dines came to be shot. Alcohol was found on the premises (illegal at the time under Prohibition), and the whole episode caused a scandal which caused some exhibitors to pull Purviance's film A Woman of Paris from theaters.
Born: Earl Torgeson, baseball player; in Snohomish, Washington (d. 1990)
Died: Billy Miske, 29, American boxer, died of Bright's disease

January 2, 1924 (Wednesday)
The Mexican government reported that federal troops loyal to President Álvaro Obregón had achieved a victory over the rebels of Adolfo de la Huerta in the vicinity of Zacualpan, State of Mexico.
Primary railway stations in Paris closed as the water level of the Seine rose due to flooding. 
The Bulgarian government gave former King Ferdinand, who had been living in exile since 1918, permission to return to Sofia. The Kingdom of Yugoslavia immediately sent an ultimatum objecting to the move.
The new Greek parliament convened.
Died: Sabine Baring-Gould, 89, English composer and novelist

January 3, 1924 (Thursday)
Howard Carter and his work team discovered the stone sarcophagus of Pharaoh Tutankhamun in his tomb near Luxor, Egypt.
The boxing-themed comedy film The Great White Way premiered at the Cosmopolitan Theatre in New York City.
The German film New Year's Eve premiered.

January 4, 1924 (Friday)
Germany issued an emergency decree known as the Emminger Reform, best known for abolishing the jury system in court proceedings and replacing it with a mixed system of judges.
The Kingdom of Yugoslavia sent another sharp note to Bulgaria saying it would not accept the return of Ferdinand from exile or any further provocations. Newspapers in Belgrade clamored for war.
Born: Wally Ris, American competitive swimmer; in Chicago (d. 1989)
Died: John Peters, 73, American baseball player

January 5, 1924 (Saturday)
The National Assembly of Greece elected national hero Eleftherios Venizelos as its Speaker, but he had to leave due to illness. It was later announced that he'd had a minor heart attack. He would only serve six days in the position.
Factories and mines in the Ruhr region shut down as laborers refused to work ten hours a day.

January 6, 1924 (Sunday)
Turkish President Mustafa Kemal Atatürk survived a bomb attack, but his wife Latife Uşşaki was injured. The assailant visited Atatürk's home and asked to see him, then threw a bomb when he appeared.
The French government gave the Catholic Church the right to reoccupy its former property under the "diocesan associations" system.
Born: Earl Scruggs, American musician and songwriter; near Boiling Springs, North Carolina (d. 2012)

January 7, 1924 (Monday)
Mexican rebels captured the oil port city of Tampico.
Kiyoura Keigo became Prime Minister of Japan.
Born: Geoffrey Bayldon, English actor; in Leeds (d. 2017)

January 8, 1924 (Tuesday)
The Soviet newspaper Pravda reported that Leon Trotsky was ill, a statement which the rank and file took to mean as a sign of his imminent removal.
United Kingdom Labour Party leader Ramsay MacDonald gave a speech at a packed Royal Albert Hall where he announced that Labour would accept office as soon as it was invited to do so, though it would be taking over a "bankrupt estate". MacDonald pledged to run the country along sound economic lines, make efforts through the League of Nations to retain peace in Europe, and end the "pompous folly" of refusing to recognize the Soviet Union.
Born: Ron Moody; actor, in Tottenham, England (d. 2015)

January 9, 1924 (Wednesday)
Ramsay MacDonald was re-elected leader of Britain's Labour Party at a full party meeting.
Born: Mary Kaye, American guitarist and performer, in Hawaii (d. 2007)
Died: Franz Josef Heinz, 39, former leader of the autonomous "Rhineland Republic", was assassinated by German nationalists.

January 10, 1924 (Thursday)
The British submarine  sank in a collision with the battleship  in a training exercise in the English Channel. All 43 crewmen were lost.
In the occupied Rhineland, the border to the rest of Germany was closed to traffic except for railroad business and food supplies and a curfew was imposed, due to fears of a new separatist coup attempt after the murder of Franz Josef Heinz the previous day.
Relations between Britain and France became strained when French Prime Minister Raymond Poincaré refused to allow British officials into the occupied Rhineland to conduct their own investigation of the separatist movement there.
Born: Max Roach, American jazz drummer; in Newland, North Carolina (d. 2007)

January 11, 1924 (Friday)
Mexican government troops recaptured Pachuca from the rebels, and began a battle to retake Tuxpan.
Born: 
Roger Guillemin, French neuroendocrinologist, recipient of the Nobel Prize in Physiology or Medicine (alive in 2021) 
Sam B. Hall, Jr., U.S. politician, in Marshall, Texas (d. 1994) 
Slim Harpo, American blues musician, in Lobdell, Louisiana (d. 1970)

January 12, 1924 (Saturday)
Mexican mountaineer irregulars loyal to President Obregón recaptured Oaxaca City from the rebels.
France rejected a British-backed proposal to arrange a League of Nations committee to investigate separatism in the Rhineland Palatinate. Prime Minister Poincaré insisted it was strictly the business of the countries directly involved in administrating the region. 
Bengali activist Gopinath Saha shot a man he thought was Calcutta police commissioner Charles Tegart, but learned that he had killed a different Englishman instead. Saha would be sentenced to death for the crime.
Born:  
Olivier Gendebien, Belgian racing driver; in Brussels (d. 1998)
Chris Chase, model, actress, and journalist, in New York City (d. 2013) 
Died: Alexis Lapointe, 63, French Canadian athlete

January 13, 1924 (Sunday)
A long meeting between British ambassador Crewe and Prime Minister Poincaré over the Rhineland separatism issue was said to be unproductive.
The American Communist newspaper The Worker changed its name to Daily Worker.
The Chicago Daily Tribune announced a nationwide contest to name the new general interest magazine the paper's owners were planning to launch in the spring. The winner would receive a $20,000 cash prize. The entry eventually chosen would be Liberty.
The crime drama film The Humming Bird, starring Gloria Swanson was released.
Born: 
Henry Fonde, American football player; in Knoxville, Tennessee (d. 2009)
Roland Petit, French dancer and choreographer; in Villemomble (d. 2011)
Died: Georg Hermann Quincke, 89, German physicist

January 14, 1924 (Monday)
Charles G. Dawes accepted the chairmanship of a committee assembled to investigate Germany's capacity to pay its war reparations.
Britain began an independent investigation into the Rhineland separatist movement, against the wishes of France.
Born: Carole Cook, American actress; in Abilene, Texas (d. 2023)
Died: Luther Emmett Holt, 68, American pediatrician

January 15, 1924 (Tuesday)
King George V and Queen Mary opened the new session of British Parliament.
The French Cabinet drafted a plan to stabilize the franc, which had lost more than three-quarters of its pre-war value. The plan called for many tax hikes and a reduction in civil servants.
The world's first radio play, Danger by Richard Hughes, was broadcast by the British Broadcasting Corporation from its studios in London.

January 16, 1924 (Wednesday)
Argentine engineer Raúl Pateras Pescara broke his own record for helicopter flight when he kept his model 2F aloft in the air for 8 minutes and 13.8 seconds at Issy-les-Moulineaux near Paris. It flew in a straight line almost three-quarters of a mile at an altitude of about fifteen feet.
The Broadway version of the 1911 German play The Miracle opened at the Century Theatre. 
At around 7:00 in the evening, the American dirigible  broke free of its mooring mast in Lakehurst, New Jersey during a raging gale and began drifting with 22 men aboard.
Born: Katy Jurado, actress; in Guadalajara, Mexico (d. 2002)
Died: Licerio Gerónimo, 68, Filipino military leader

January 17, 1924 (Thursday)
The  was brought back under control and lowered into the hangar around 3:20 in the morning.
H. H. Asquith of the Liberal Party made a surprising speech in the British House of Commons pledging to support a minority government headed by the Labour Party, making the fall of the Stanley Baldwin Conservative government almost certain.

January 18, 1924 (Friday)
Conflicting accounts arose as to the whereabouts of Leon Trotsky amid rumors he had been arrested. He was in fact traveling to the Black Sea to convalesce from illness.
A Soviet party conference ended with the passing of a resolution blaming Trotsky for divisions within the Communist Party. Joseph Stalin attacked Trotsky in a withering speech accusing him of sowing dissent.  
A preliminary hearing into the New Year's Day shooting of Courtland Dines began in Los Angeles. Edna Purviance testified that she was not present in the room when the shooting occurred.
In Madison Square Garden, world middleweight boxing champion Harry Greb defeated Johnny Wilson in a fifteen-round decision to retain the title.

January 19, 1924 (Saturday)
"This area is certain to be of high strategic value if we look forward to warfare and commerce in the future", he said. 
The short story "The Most Dangerous Game" by Richard Connell appeared in this week's issue of Collier's.
Born: Jean-François Revel, French writer and philosopher; in Marseille (d. 2006)

January 20, 1924 (Sunday)
Mexican rebels captured the Tabascan capital of Villahermosa.
HC Château-d'Oex won the ninth Swiss International Ice Hockey Championship, defeating HC Davos 3–2 in the Final.
The Swedish football club Växjö BK was founded.

January 21, 1924 (Monday)
Vladimir Lenin, the semi-retired founder and leader of the Soviet Union and the Soviet Communist Party, died at his estate in Gorki at 18:50 hrs Moscow time following a stroke.  
Top Soviet leaders were convening at the Eleventh All-Russia Congress of Soviets at the Bolshoi Theatre when news of Lenin's death was communicated by telephone; an eyewitness reported never seeing so many men in tears.
At midnight, 60,000 rail workers went on strike in the United Kingdom to protest a recent reduction in wages ordered by the National Wage Board. British newspapers with nationwide distribution arranged fleets of trucks to maintain their circulations during the work stoppage.
The British House of Commons passed a motion of no confidence against the Stanley Baldwin government, 328 to 256.
Mabel Normand and Courtland S. Dines testified in the New Year's Day shooting case when the court convened in the hospital where they were staying (Normand was there with an inflamed appendix). Both of them claimed to be unable to remember much about the incident. 
The musical comedy Lollipop with book by Zelda Sears, lyrics by Sears and Walter De Leon and music by Vincent Youmans opened on Broadway.
Born: Benny Hill, English comedian and TV actor known for his risque syndicated program ; in Southampton (d. 1992)

January 22, 1924 (Tuesday)
King George V summoned Labour Party leader Ramsay MacDonald to Buckingham Palace and asked him to form a government. MacDonald accepted and became the first Labour Prime Minister of the United Kingdom.
A complete autopsy was conducted on Lenin's body. A cerebral hemorrhage was given as the cause of death.
The first issue of Howard University student newspaper The Hilltop was published.
Born: Sonny Myers, American professional wrestler (d. 2007)

January 23, 1924 (Wednesday)
Lenin's casket was transported to the House of the Unions and placed in its Hall of Columns.
Soviet architect Alexey Shchusev was given the task of constructing a tomb for Lenin within three days.
Saltillo and Monterrey fell into the hands of Mexican insurgents.
Britain and the United States signed a treaty allowing American authorities to search British ships suspected of rum-running.
The Western film Heritage of the Desert, starring Bebe Daniels, was released.
Born: Frank Lautenberg; U.S. politician, in Paterson, New Jersey (d. 2013)

January 24, 1924 (Thursday)
The Teapot Dome scandal deepened when oil tycoon Edward L. Doheny admitted in testimony that he had lent Senator Albert B. Fall $100,000.
Born: William Jerome McCormack, Prelate of the Roman Catholic Church; in New York City (d. 2013)
Died: Marie-Adélaïde, Grand Duchess of Luxembourg, 29

January 25, 1924 (Friday)
The first Winter Olympics opened in Chamonix, France.
France and Czechoslovakia signed a mutual defense pact pledging aid in the event of an unprovoked attack by a third party.
A coal mine explosion killed 37 miners near Johnston City, Illinois.
Mexican rebels took Morelia after a four-day battle.
Born: 
Lou Groza, American football player and enshrinee in the Pro Football Hall of Fame; in Martins Ferry, Ohio (d. 2000)
Husein Mehmedov, Bulgarian Olympic wrestler; in Razgrad (d. 2014)
Speedy West, American guitarist and record producer, in Springfield, Missouri (d. 2003)

January 26, 1924 (Saturday)
U.S. President Calvin Coolidge announced he would appoint special counsels from both parties to prosecute any criminal wrongdoing in the Teapot Dome scandal.
The Soviet Union announced that the city of Petrograd had been renamed Leningrad.
Princess Nagako married Prince Regent Hirohito in Tokyo.
An explosion killed 36 miners at the Lancashire No. 18 Mine in Shanktown, Pennsylvania.
Saad Zaghloul became Prime Minister of Egypt.
Born: Annette Strauss, American philanthropist and politician; in Houston (d. 1998)

January 27, 1924 (Sunday)
A state funeral was held for Vladimir Lenin in Moscow's Red Square under frigid (−35 degrees Fahrenheit) conditions.  
Italy and the Kingdom of Serbs, Croats and Slovenes signed the Treaty of Rome which agreed that Fiume would be annexed to Italy while Sušak would go the Kingdom of Serbs, Croats, and Slovenes.
Benito Mussolini dissolved the Chamber of Deputies and called new elections.
Born: Sabu Dastagir, Indian film actor; in Karapur, Mysore, British India (d. 1963)

January 28, 1924 (Monday)
Campaigning began for a general election in Italy. Benito Mussolini addressed 10,000 Blackshirts in the Palazzo Venezia in Rome, predicting complete victory at the polls and declaring that the Fascists were "ready to kill or die."
The U.S. House of Representatives adopted a resolution appropriating $100,000 for the use of special counsel to pursue the investigation and any charges in the Teapot Dome scandal.
A trial began in Milwaukee over a lawsuit brought by banned baseball player Shoeless Joe Jackson against the Chicago White Sox for $18,200 in backpay. 
Born: 
Hans Mortier, Dutch professional wrestler; in Leiden (d. 2010)
Betty Tucker, baseball player for the AAGPBL; in Detroit (d. 2012)

January 29, 1924 (Tuesday)
Britain's railway strike was settled.
Charles G. Dawes and other members of his committee arrived in Berlin.
Mexican federal troops won a hard-fought battle for Esperanza.
Born: Luigi Nono, Italian composer; in Venice (d. 1990)

January 30, 1924 (Wednesday)
Joe Jackson took the stand in his lawsuit against the White Sox. 
Born: 
Lloyd Alexander, American author; in Philadelphia(d. 2007)
Sailor Art Thomas, American professional wrestler; in Gurdon, Arkansas (d. 2003)

January 31, 1924 (Thursday)
The United States Senate passed a resolution concerning the Teapot Dome scandal, stating that the leases to the Mammoth Oil Company and the Pan American Petroleum Company "were executed under circumstances indicating fraud and corruption".
Japanese Prime Minister Kiyoura Keigo dissolved the National Diet and called for new elections. A brawl broke out during the morning session over accusations that the government had failed to protect a train that prominent opposition leaders were riding on when it was pelted with rocks and timbers.
White Sox owner Charles Comiskey took the stand as a hostile witness in the Joe Jackson lawsuit trial. 
Former U.S. President Woodrow Wilson was reported to be seriously ill with a digestive disorder.
Twenty-four days after the death of his wife, Prussian state executioner Paul Spaethe dressed in formal evening wear, lit 45 candles – one for each person he had beheaded – and committed suicide with a revolver.

References

1924
1924-01
1924-01